The White Guard is a Russian television series, based on the novel by Bulgakov, The White Guard.

Plot
The film tells about the arduous years of the civil war in Russia, portraying the fate of the Turbin family who fell into a cycle of sad events of the 1918-1919 winter in Kiev. The basis for the film's plot is the novel by Mikhail Bulgakov: The White Guard. The historical background of the film is the fall of the Ukrainian power of Hetman Skoropadsky, the capture of Kiev by UNR troops and their subsequent flight under the blows of the Red Army.

The protagonist Alexei Turbin is a military physician who has seen and experienced a lot during the three years of the world war. He is one of those tens of thousands of Russian officers who after the revolution found themselves in a situation of complete uncertainty in political and private life. Many of them went to the service of Hetman Skoropadsky and his moderate regime under the German protectorate, considering it a lesser evil than the red terror already noted in Kiev against officers and intelligentsia by the Bolsheviks. However, the German Empire was defeated on the fronts of the First World War, the Hetman fled with the Germans, and a few Russian officers and junker (cadets) remained the only force able to stand in the way of the followers of Symon Petliura coming to Kiev.

Cast

Konstantin Khabensky as Alexei Vasilievich Turbin, a military doctor.
Mikhail Porechenkov as Victor Myshlaevsky, Lieutenant of Artillery
Yevgeny Dyatlov as Leonid Shervinsky
Andrei Zibrov as Alexander Bronislavovich Studzinsky
Yanina Studilina as Anna
Sergei Brune as Lariosik
Nikolay Yefremov as Nikolay Turbin 
Kseniya Rappoport as Elena Thalberg
Sergei Garmash as Kozyr-Leshko, Colonel of Petlyura forces
Yuri Itskov as Vasilisa (Lisovich), a neighbor of Turbin family
Fyodor Bondarchuk as Shpolyansky, Ensign Futurist
Alexei Serebryakov as Felix Nay-Tours, colonel of the Hussars
Mariya Lugovaya as Irina Nay-Tours
Yevgeny Stychkin as Second Lieutenant of Artillery Stepanov (Karas)
Sergei Shakurov as Hetman Skoropadsky
Sergei Barkovsky as father Alexander, priest 
Kirill Zhandarov as Strashkevich, Ensign
Artur Smolyaninov as Adjutant Boyko
Ekaterina Vilkova as Julia Reiss
Yevgeny  Yefremov as Wolf
Vladimir Vdovichenkov as Pleshko, Captain
Yuri Stoyanov as Blokhin, Maj.-Gen.
Yevgenia Dobrovolskaya as Vanda
Aleksei Guskov as Malyshev, colonel, commander of mortar squadron
Ivan I. Krasko as Maxim
Arthur Vakha az Zamansky
Igor Vernik as Shchur
Sergey Trifonov as Bourgeois
Igor Chernevich as Sergey Thalberg
Dennis Reyshahrit as cashier in the cinema theater

The Crew
Written by: Marina Dyachenko, Sergey Dyachenko, Sergey Snezhkin
Directed by: Sergei Snezhkin
Screenplay by Sergei Machilskiy

The film was shot in St. Petersburg and Vyborg (Leningrad Oblast) by help of Lenfilm studios.

Reception 

The series has received unanimously negative comments from all sides, the alterations of Bulgakov's novel and the acting skills of the actors being particularly criticised.

The Ukrainian Culture Ministry decides not to issue distribution licenses for it as they "show contempt for the Ukrainian language, people and the state," and "some facts are distorted to benefit Russia."

See also
 The Days of the Turbins - a 1976 Soviet film

References

Russia-1 original programming
2010s Russian television series
2012 Russian television series debuts
2012 Russian television series endings
Russian drama television series
Films based on works by Mikhail Bulgakov
Television shows based on Russian novels